UFC 108: Evans vs. Silva was a mixed martial arts event held by the Ultimate Fighting Championship on January 2, 2010, in Las Vegas, Nevada at the MGM Grand Garden Arena.

Background 
The card for UFC 108 was plagued with numerous injuries, with multiple potential fights being called off as a result.

A proposed main event featured UFC Middleweight Champion Anderson Silva facing off against former UFC Light Heavyweight Champion Vitor Belfort. However, it was announced by Silva's manager, Ed Soares, that the fight would not happen at UFC 108 because Silva would not be fully healed from elbow surgery.

A bout between Brock Lesnar and Shane Carwin for the UFC Heavyweight Championship was rescheduled from UFC 106 to UFC 108, but this fight did not take place due to a continuing medical condition suffered by Lesnar.

The winner of a bout between Antônio Rodrigo Nogueira and Cain Velasquez was to be guaranteed a title shot for the UFC Heavyweight Championship against the eventual winner of the Lesnar vs. Carwin bout. The planned bout was later scrapped when Nogueira was forced to pull out of the fight due to a severe case of staph infection. A possible Velasquez vs. Carwin match for an interim belt had been ruled out as a new main event due to Carwin undergoing knee surgery, although there were talks of the fight possibly happening at a later date. The Nogueira/Velasquez bout was scheduled for February 21, 2010 at UFC 110, though it was not for the interim belt.

Gabriel Gonzaga was forced to pull out of his bout with Junior dos Santos on November 25, due to illness.  Gonzaga was replaced by Gilbert Yvel.

Paul Daley was scheduled to face Carlos Condit, but on December 9, it was announced that Condit had pulled out due to injury. Condit was replaced by Dustin Hazelett.

On December 11, Tyson Griffin pulled out of his bout with Jim Miller, citing an injury. Sean Sherk, who originally had a fight with Rafaello Oliveira, stepped up as Griffin's replacement. However, on December 17, Sherk pulled out of the fight; Duane Ludwig would eventually replace Sherk.

Martin Kampmann vs. Rory Markham was also called off days later due to a knee injury. On December 14 it was announced that Jacob Volkmann would be replacing Markham. Volkmann came off short rest after last fighting at UFC 106.

On December 29, it was announced that Steve Cantwell had pulled out of his scheduled bout with Vladimir Matyushenko.  Since there was no time to find a suitable replacement to face Matyushenko, the bout was called off.

Results

Bonus awards 
Fighters were awarded $50,000 bonuses.

 Fight of the Night: Joe Lauzon vs. Sam Stout
 Knockout of the Night: Paul Daley
 Submission of the Night: Cole Miller

Reported payout 
The following is the reported payout to the fighters as reported to the Nevada State Athletic Commission. It does not include sponsor money or "locker room" bonuses often given by the UFC and also do not include the UFC's traditional "fight night" bonuses.

Rashad Evans: $375,000 (includes $175,000 win bonus) def. Thiago Silva: $55,000
Paul Daley: $34,200 ($18,000 win bonus) def. Dustin Hazelett: $19,800 ^
Sam Stout: $24,000 ($12,000 win bonus) def. Joe Lauzon: $12,000
Jim Miller: $30,000 ($15,000 win bonus) def. Duane Ludwig: $12,000
Junior dos Santos: $60,000 ($30,000 win bonus) def. Gilbert Yvel: $30,000
Martin Kampmann: $46,000 ($23,000 win bonus) def. Jacob Volkmann: $6,000
Cole Miller: $24,000 ($12,000 win bonus) def. Dan Lauzon: $15,000
Mark Munoz: $32,000 ($16,000 win bonus) def. Ryan Jensen: $6,000
Jake Ellenberger: $20,000 ($10,000 win bonus) def. Mike Pyle: $16,000
Rafaello Oliveira: $20,000 ($10,000 win bonus) def. John Gunderson: $8,000

^ Paul Daley was fined 10 percent of his "show" money for failing to make the 170-pound welterweight limit; the $1,800 was awarded to Dustin Hazelett.

See also
 Ultimate Fighting Championship
 List of UFC champions
 List of UFC events
 2010 in UFC

References 

Ultimate Fighting Championship events
2010 in mixed martial arts
Mixed martial arts in Las Vegas
2010 in sports in Nevada
MGM Grand Garden Arena